Nudist Paradise is a 1959 British film. It was also known as Nature's Paradise in the United States.

It was the first British nudist movie.

Plot
Mike Malone (Carl Conway) is in love with a secretary called Joan (Anita Love) who is a nudist.

Production
The film was shot on location at Britain's then leading naturist club, Spielplatz in St Albans, whose owners Charles and Dorothy Macaskie, make cameo appearances.

Reception
The film was a success at the box office recouping its cost in a matter of weeks. It inspired a number of similar films set in nudist camps.

References

External links
Nudist Paradise at BFI

British drama films
Nudity in film
1950s English-language films